The 1993 Women's World Snooker Championship was a women's snooker tournament played in the United Kingdom in 1993. Defending champion Allison Fisher beat Stacey Hillyard 9–3 in the final to win the title.

Tournament summary
The competition was promoted by Barry Hearn's Matchroom organisation and sponsored by Trusthouse Forte, with a total prize fund of £40,000. Fisher was the defending champion, having won the 1991 Women's World Snooker Championship, as the Women's World Championship was not held in 1992.

The Qualifying stages were held in Surrey and the final stages at the Imperial Hotel, Blackpool. There was television coverage of the event some days after the final, on Eurosport and London Weekend Television, the latter starting at 3:30 am.

The winner, Allison Fisher received £10,000 in prize money, and Stacey Hillyard received £5,000 as runner-up. The losing semi-finalists received £2,500 each, and the losing quarter-finalists £1,250 each.  Fisher compiled the highest  of the tournament, an 81 in her semi-final against Ann-Marie Farren.

Main draw
Source: Snooker Scene

References

World Women's Snooker Championship
1993 in snooker
1993 in English sport